Jack Gardiner (20 May 1913 – 11 September 1976) was an Australian cricketer. He played fourteen first-class matches for Tasmania between 1935 and 1949.

See also
 List of Tasmanian representative cricketers

References

External links
 

1913 births
1976 deaths
Australian cricketers
Tasmania cricketers
Cricketers from Hobart